The Association of National Park Authorities (ANPA) is a body that exists to provide the national park authorities of England,  Wales and Scotland a focus for collaborative working and the sharing of best practice across the parks, training of national park authority members, and attempts to increase public understanding of the statutory purposes for which national parks exist in the UK, and promotes them as models for sustainable development, using the brand National Parks – Britain's breathing spaces.

Its small staff based in Cardiff is managed by an executive committee made up of the chairs of all fifteen of the individual national park authorities.

There are separate bodies for England and Wales, the English National Parks Authority Association and National Parks Wales, that represents the ten English national park authorities and the three Welsh national park authorities respectively when dealing with central government and national agencies.

ANPA members
There are ten national parks in England, three in Wales and two in Scotland, they are:
England: Dartmoor, Exmoor, Lake District, New Forest, Northumberland, North York Moors, Peak District, South Downs, Yorkshire Dales and The Broads which has equivalent status to a National Park.   
Wales: Brecon Beacons, Pembrokeshire Coast and Snowdonia
Scotland: Cairngorms and Loch Lomond and the Trossachs

See also
Campaign for National Parks

References

External links
Association of National Park Authorities home page
National Parks England home page
National Parks Wales home page

National parks of the United Kingdom
Organisations based in Cardiff
National park administrators